SBK Generations is a motorcycle racing video game. It is the final game published by Black Bean Games and is the sixth installment of the SBK series developed by Milestone. SBK Generations features riders and tracks from the Superbike World Championship, across the 2009 to 2012 seasons.

Reception 
SBK Generations received "mixed or average reviews", according to the review aggregator Metacritic. Motorcycle News gave the game a 2/5 score, while Gamereactor gave a score of 6 out of 10, noting that "for newcomers and casuals, it's a tough nut to crack, lacking the entry-level finesse to make it appealing".

References

External links 
SBK Generations at MobyGames

2012 video games
Superbike World Championship video games
Milestone srl games
PlayStation 3 games
Video games developed in Italy
Windows games
Xbox 360 games
Black Bean Games games
Multiplayer and single-player video games